Veebel is an Estonian military rank which has existed since the 20th century. The word veebel is derived from the German rank name of Feldwebel, and is usually, but incorrectly, translated into English as Sergeant. The official translation given by the Estonian Army is Warrant Officer, although the rank is equivalent to the British Army rank of Sergeant in the NATO code.

Defence Forces

The rank marks mainly senior non-commissioned officers in the Estonian Army and Estonian Air Force.

See also
 Military ranks of Estonia
 Ranks and insignia of NATO Armies Enlisted (Army)
 Ranks and insignia of NATO

References 

Military ranks of Estonia